Christina Müssner (born 10 December 1993) is a Liechtensteiner footballer who plays as a striker for Schlieren and the Liechtenstein national football team.

Career statistics

International

International goals

References

1993 births
Living people
Women's association football midfielders
Liechtenstein women's international footballers
Liechtenstein women's footballers